SE scale is a designation used by some modellers to describe miniature (model) trains which run on either Gauge 1 track or O gauge track.  In SE scale, 7/8 of an inch equals one foot, which is a ratio of 1:13.7. On  gauge track this represents real life narrow gauge railways that are  gauge, while on  gauge track this represents  railways.

Modelling in a scale where 7/8 inch = 1 foot - 0 inches is relatively new (within the last 20 years) and, as a result, the majority of the modellers build from scratch.

See also
 Rail transport modelling scales
 Model railway scales

External links
 http://www.7-8ths.info/ - Forum

Model railroad scales
Narrow gauge railway modelling